Bridgend Sports Rugby Football Club is a Welsh rugby union team based in Bridgend, South Wales. Formed in 1938 by Victor Blick, the team survived the cessation of club rugby in Wales between 1939 and 1945, during the Second World War. There has been in existence at least two other clubs in Bridgend throughout the club's history providing local competition. The club is a member of the Welsh Rugby Union and presently play in WRU Division 2 West Central.

1938 - The Beginning & Our Founder Victor Blick 

Victor Blick came to Bridgend in the late 1920s as a post-man from Neath and he formed the Bridgend District Time Limit Cricket League in 1936 held at the Brewery Field. His greatest achievement was the foundation of Bridgend Sports Club which had a tremendous influence on local teenagers in the late 1930s and early 40s.

One wet evening in 1938, sitting on the steps of the old Town Hall whilst waiting for the second house to start at the Embassy Cinema, he and his best mates, Trevor Davies and Roy Davies of Newcastle Hill, came to the opinion that there was room for another Rugby Club in the town. There was already Bridgend RFC and Bridgend Athletic (a different club to the present club. The new ‘Ath’ just took their name). Charlie Griffiths recalls “It is quite remarkable looking back to see how quickly things developed from that inauspicious beginning”. For changing facilities, Victor obtained the use of stables at the back of Caedre Street (off Park Street), the bathing facilities there were three large tubs of water for each side. The stables were owned by the local vet and first treasurer Bryn Williams of St Marie Street recalls taking the rent to him on a monthly basis. By the end of 1938 showers were installed and the stables used as the Club House.
The laws at this time made it difficult to play open rugby, but it was down to Victor Blick’s insistence on playing an open game, from the very beginning, that was responsible for the Sports playing the type of rugby we still appreciate today. Getting fixtures was no problem as sides wanted to play clubs with this sort of attitude. With the outbreak of World War 2 most rugby ceased, but somehow Victor managed to keep the Club alive by organising occasional fixtures against RAF St Athan and the Royal Ordnance Factory sides. With the cessation of the hostilities it was not too difficult for the Club to reform. In 1946 Victor organised the first tour to Devon where the Sports played Barnstable and Biddeford. It was a real success despite Victor asking for £10 a head for the hotel. Of course no one paid that - a kings ransom at the time.

History 
1938 - 1958

Victor Blick’s greatest achievement was the foundation of Bridgend Sports Club which had a tremendous influence on local teenagers in the late 1930s and early 40s. The late Charlie Griffiths recalled “It is quite remarkable looking back to see how quickly things developed from that inauspicious beginning”.

It was down to Victor Blick’s insistence on playing an open game that generations of Sports players derived so much pleasure over the years.

The mid 1950s saw a great period of Sports Rugby with our only “Invincible” season to date, 1954-1955. Captained by the great Fred Gronow, who played the most games taking the field for 32 of the 35 matches. The team featured Derek Davies, who secured the record points tally with 90, Dennis Speck scored the most tries with 13, followed by Ron Meadows with 10 tries. Edwin Slade and Peter Wright joined the side and helped secure a finishing record of:- P35 W30 D5 L0. Truly Invincible!
1958 - 1978

This was the era in which the Sports built a side of great stature and skill.

In 1959 the side with Clive Hathaway, Peter Wright and Brian Holl as well as Ashong and Greenslade won a Sevens competition in Scotland.

The Club supplied players to Bridgend on a regular basis and won many Sevens competitions both in Wales, England and even in the USA. With a very strong fixture list built by Jack Braund, the Club chose to honour these fixtures rather than opt into the League system that was offered up by the WRU in the next decade. A decision that proved to be wrong as the leagues developed.

1978 - 1998

Building on that very strong team, the late 1970s and early 1980s saw three Silver Ball final Wins on the trot! A great achievement. Bridgend Sports were already causing ripples in the higher-archy of Welsh rugby.

Quite simply we were the best.

When the final decision to opt out of leagues happened we were placed in a much lower league than our status demanded. But the spirit of the Sports never faltered and over the next 10 years there was great loyalty and endeavour by both the players and the Committee as the Club looked to revive its status and develop a young growing Club.

1998 - 2018

When the Sports won the Division 5 league title we started that climb up the leagues that was planned. This in conjunction with the starting of a Mini and Junior section was to prove to be the best forward planning decision to date.   
The contribution by a number of key coaches in the past can not be over-stated and thanks go to Steve Rees, Mark Watts, Rhys Dowling, Roddy Boobyer, Keith Burke and Lyndon Griffiths. Successive captains have given these coaches 100% backing and that again is immeasurable so thanks to Punter, Norris, Wilson and Greg Thomas.

2018 - 2019 / The 80th Anniversary Season

The Sports celebrated their 80th Season with a stellar year on the Pitch. The 1st XV were crowned Champions of WRU West Central 3 A on the last day of the season in front of just under 1000 supporters at the Bandstand by beating old rivals and league runners up Pyle RFC. The side also reached the semi final of the WRU Bowl losing a very close game to Oakdale RFC and reached the Final of the District Cup and the Presidents Cup.
To appreciate what was achieved in our 80th Season these are the thoughts of the Coaches that Season Sean Donovan and Gareth David.

"What a fantastic season and one I'm sure we will all remember and talk about for many years to come.

The Cup run was something else, beating ‘The Ath’. Winning away with the last kick of the game against Vardre. The two North Wales mini tours to Wrexham and Dolgellau which made up for us having to cancel our official tour to Belgium. The quarter final at home to Pontyclun and one of our best performances. Then to the Oakdale game in the Semi Final, where unfortunately we came second on the day, but standing there at the end and seeing all the support on the sidelines from under 7's all the way up to the senior generations was pretty humbling for all involved.

Making it to the Principality Stadium would have been the icing on the cake but it wasn't meant to be.

To go unbeaten for the rest of the season and maintaining an undefeated home record was pretty unbelievable when we look back at possibly the hardest run in any club from any division had. It all came down to that final day and a pretty brutal game against close rivals Pyle. Looking at comments going around I believe we made a lot of clubs in the area jealous that day of what a great and we'll supported club Bridgend Sports continues to be.

Again couldn't have been more prouder to have been involved in such a great day. Credited has to go to our captain Greg and everyone of the squad who trained and played with real enthusiasm and energy all season."

The Junior Section of the Club also played their part with the U12's winning the District D GMG Cup and the U15s making the Semi Finals of the Ospreys Cup. In the 2018/2019 season the Club were delighted when an under 7’s player from 12 years ago, Zac Hemsley, who registered on the first day of our Mini’s season played for our first team.

Club Honours
 Glamorgan County Silver Ball Trophy 1978-79 - Winners
 Glamorgan County Silver Ball Trophy 1979-80 - Winners
 Glamorgan County Silver Ball Trophy 1980-81 - Winners
WRU Division Five South Central 2009/10 - Champions
WRU Division Three West Central A - 2018/2019 - Champions

Presidents 
Current: Marc Jehu

Chairman 
2022 - Current: Steve Pilliner 

2014 - 2022: Andrew Murphy

1st XV Captain 
2022 - Current: Lloyd Wilson 

2021 - Andrew Gill

2018 - 2021: Greg Thomas

2015 - 2018: Lloyd Wilson

2010 - 2015: Gary Punter

2008 - 2010: Chris Norris

Internationals 
Dewi Lake - Wales - 1st Cap vs Ireland, 5/2/22 / Wales U20 Captain 2019 / Sports 2011 to 2017 / Ospreys 2017 to current

Notes 



Welsh rugby union teams